Boris Miletić (born 2 September 1975) is a Croatian economist and politician who has been prefect of Istria County since 2021 and president of the Istrian Democratic Assembly (IDS) from 2014 to 2021.

Miletić did his undergraduate studies at the Pula Faculty of Economics and Tourism "Dr. Mijo Mirković" in 1999, and would return to get his master's degree in 2002. He has also pursued further education at the Cleveland State University as well as the Faculty of Economics in Split and Zagreb.

From 2000 to 2006 Miletić served in various civil service positions in Istria County, including an internship with the Department for the Economy (2000–2001) and with the Istrian Development Agency (2001–2006), where he would eventually become CEO.

Miletić became the mayor of Pula in June 2006, and would win subsequent elections in 2009, 2013 and 2017. He served in the Croatian Parliament from 2008 to 2011 as a member of the IDS.

In 2014, after the expulsion of Damir Kajin from the IDS, Miletić became party's leader. In the 2015 parliamentary election, Miletić and party leaders decided to leave the Kukuriku coalition (afterwards known as the Croatia is Growing coalition) and have the party contest the election on its own. The party would go on to win three seats.

After the local elections in 2021, Miletić resigned as party president after the heavy defeat of the IDS in Istria County.

In 2022, the IDS presidency initiated disciplinary proceedings against Miletić, after which he left the party.

References

Living people
1975 births
Representatives in the modern Croatian Parliament
Istrian Democratic Assembly politicians
People from Pula